Maersk Boston is the first of the Maersk B-class of fast container ships. She was then called the "MV Boston", to reflect her charter to MSC in September 2010.

She has the capacity for approximately 4,000 containers and was designed for rapid transportation between China and the USA. Along with four of her sister ships, she was laid up in Loch Striven in Scotland.

Design 
She can operate at 29 knots.

Operated by a crew of 20, the vessel has a gymnasium and hospital.

History
Mærsk Boston was the first of a series of seven fast container ships built by Volkswerft in Germany for Maersk. Launched in 2006, MV Boston is registered in København. A downturn in world economy means that the B-class vessels have never operated their intended route. Designed for a service speed of 29 kn, their fuel consumption (300 tonnes per day) makes them uneconomic. Reducing the operating speed to 12 kn, reduced fuel consumption to 50 tonnes per day. However the reduction in cargo being moved favours more economical vessels, such as Edith Mærsk.

Boston was rafted up in Loch Striven on the Clyde in Scotland, together with Mærsk Beaumont, Mærsk Bentonville and Mærsk Baltimore. After ten months, Boston left Loch Striven on 11 June 2010. Their older fleetmate, Sealand Performance left the raft on 21 May 2010. During the lay up, the raft was used to film a BBC children's TV show, Mission:2110, which premiered in May 2010.

Sister ships
2006 Mærsk Baltimore 9313917
2007 Mærsk Beaumont 9313967
2006 Mærsk Bentonville 9313929
2007 Mærsk Brooklyn 9313931
2007 Mærsk Brownsville 9313955
2007 Mærsk Buffalo 9313943

References 

Container ships
Ships of the Maersk Line
2006 ships